Wasseiges is a municipality of  Wallonia located in the province of Liège, Belgium. 

On January 1, 2006, Wasseiges had a total population of 2,517. The total area is 24.45 km² which gives a population density of 103 inhabitants per km².

The municipality consists of the following districts: Acosse, Ambresin, Meeffe, and Wasseiges.

See also
 List of protected heritage sites in Wasseiges

References

External links
 

Municipalities of Liège Province